Sopron (German: Ödenburg) was an administrative county (comitatus) of the Kingdom of Hungary. Its territory is now divided between Austria and Hungary. The capital of the county was Sopron.

Geography 
Sopron county shared borders with the Austrian land Lower Austria and the Hungarian counties Moson, Győr, Veszprém and Vas. The Lake Neusiedl (Hungarian: Fertő tó, German: Neusiedler See) lay in the county. Its area was about 3,256 km2 around 1910.

History 
The Sopron comitatus arose as one of the first comitati of the Kingdom of Hungary.

In 1920, by the Treaty of Trianon the western part of the county became part of Austria, while the eastern part became a part of Hungary. In 1921, it was decided by referendum that the city of Sopron and eight surrounding settlements would join Hungary instead of Austria.

In 1950, Sopron county merged with Győr-Moson county to form Győr-Sopron county, while a small part of Sopron county went to Vas county. The county was renamed to Győr-Moson-Sopron county in 1990.

Demographics

1900
In 1900, the county had a population of 279,796 people and was composed of the following linguistic communities:

Total:

 Hungarian: 136,616 (48.8%)
 German: 109,369 (39.1%)
 Croatian: 31,317 (11.2%)
 Slovak: 505 (0.2%)
 Romanian: 22 (0.0%)
 Serbian: 12 (0.0%)
 Ruthenian: 4 (0.0%)
 Other or unknown: 1,951 (0.7%)

According to the census of 1900, the county was composed of the following religious communities:

Total:

 Roman Catholic: 235,390 (84.1%)
 Lutheran: 33,924 (12.1%)
 Jewish: 9,736 (3,5)
 Calvinist: 641 (0.2%)
 Greek Catholic: 53 (0.0%)
 Greek Orthodox: 26 (0.0%)
 Unitarian: 15 (0.0%)
 Other or unknown: 11 (0.0%)

1910

In 1910, the county had a population of 283,510 people and was composed of the following linguistic communities:

Total:

 Hungarian: 141,011 (49.7%)
 German: 109,160 (38.5%)
 Croatian: 31,004 (10.9%)
 Slovak: 397 (0.1%)
 Romanian: 33 (0.0%)
 Serbian: 15 (0.0%)
 Ruthenian: 4 (0.0%)
 Other or unknown: 1,886 (0.7%)

According to the census of 1910, the county was composed of the following religious communities:

Total:

 Roman Catholic: 239,578 (84.5%)
 Lutheran: 34,820 (12.3%)
 Jewish: 8,192 (2,9)
 Calvinist: 743 (0.3%)
 Greek Catholic: 93 (0.0%)
 Greek Orthodox: 50 (0.0%)
 Unitarian: 27 (0.0%)
 Other or unknown: 7 (0.0%)

Subdivisions 

In the early 20th century, the subdivisions of Sopron county were:

Eisenstadt, Mattersburg, Rust and Oberpullendorf are now in Austria.

References

States and territories established in the 11th century
States and territories disestablished in 1920
States and territories disestablished in 1950
Counties in the Kingdom of Hungary
Győr-Moson-Sopron County
Sopron
Eisenstadt-Umgebung District
Eisenstadt
Mattersburg District
Oberpullendorf District
Vas County